The Lion Wakes is the first novel of the Kingdom series by Scottish writer of historical fiction, Robert Low, released on 14 April 2011 through Harper. The novel was well received.

Plot
The story revolves around the fictional character of Hal Sientcler of Herdmanston. Hal owns a minor holding in Lothian and the novel describes Hal's problems regarding the appointment of John Balliol by Edward I of England as the King of Scotland. The book follows the beginning of the story of William Wallace and Robert the Bruce, culminating in the Battle of Falkirk, during the Wars of Scottish Independence.

Reception
The novel was well received.

In a review for The Scotsman, the reviewer found the novel "gripping, written with great bravura, and dense in texture." The reviewer comments that the novel does require concentration while reading given "the plot is as confused and full of contradictions as the history on which it draws", however states that "the attention required is well rewarded", ending the review simply with "The Lion Wakes is remarkable".

Fellow historical fiction writer M.M. Bennetts praised the novel's prose, stating that "I am revelling in his similes. I love these turns of language so much I could kiss the page." and, of the novel as a whole, "It's grand–lively, colourful, heavy on the reeking, captivating, saucy, villanous, honest."

References

External links
 

2011 British novels
Novels set in the Middle Ages
Scottish historical novels
Novels by Robert Low
Lothian
Novels set in Scotland
HarperCollins books